Milenko "Mikica" Bogićević (born 7 December 1976) is a Serbian professional basketball coach who is an assistant coach for AS Monaco of the French LNB Pro A and the EuroLeague.

Coaching career 
Bogićević started his coaching career in 1995 joining a youth system coaching staff of the Belgrade based team Beovuk 72. In 2004, he became the head coach of their senior team. He left Beovuk 72 after the 2006–07 season. Prior to the 2007–08 season, coach Mihailo Uvalin added Bogićević to his coaching staff at the Polish team Polpak Świecie. During the 2008–09 season, Bogićević assisted Uvalin in Mega Hypo Leasing.

From 2010 to 2012, Bogićević was an assistant coach for Donetsk of the Ukrainian SuperLeague as a member of the coaching staff of Saša Obradović. In July 2012, Bogićević became an assistant coach for Alba Berlin of the German Basketball Bundesliga joining the Obradović coaching staff.

In 2016, Bogićević was named as an assistant coach for Lokomotiv Kuban of the Russian VTB United League, joining the Obradović's staff. On 20 December 2017, Bogićević led the Lokomotiv team to a 91–69 road win over RETAbet Bilbao Basket. The Lokomotiv head coach had fallen ill and missed their EuroCup game against Bilbao. Bogićević parted ways with Lokomotiv Kuban in summer 2018. During the 2019–20 season, Bogićević was an assistant coach for AS Monaco.

On 10 June 2020, coach Obradović added Bogićević to the Crvena zvezda coaching staff as his first assistant. Bogićević left the Zvezda following the departure of coach Obradović in December 2020.

On 15 April 2021, Ukrainian club Prometey under Ronen Ginzburg added Bogićević as their new first assistant coach. He was an interim head coach during the 2021 Ukrainian SuperLeague Finals. In July 2022, Bogićević was named as an assistant coach for AS Monaco.

Career achievements  
As assistant coach
 Ukrainian SuperLeague champion: 2 (with Donetsk: 2011–12; with Prometey: 2020–21)
 German Cup winner: 3 (with Alba Berlin: 2013, 2014, 2016)
 Russian Cup winner: 1 (with Lokomotiv Kuban: 2018)

References

External links
 Profile at eurobasket.com
 Milenko Bogicevic at realgm.com

1976 births
Living people
SC Prometey coaches
KK Beovuk 72 coaches
KK Crvena zvezda assistant coaches
People from Krupanj
Serbian expatriate basketball people in Germany
Serbian expatriate basketball people in Monaco
Serbian expatriate basketball people in Poland
Serbian expatriate basketball people in Russia
Serbian expatriate basketball people in Ukraine
Serbian basketball scouts
Serbian men's basketball coaches